The 2020-21 Ukrainian Amateur Cup season was scheduled to start on September 16, 2020.

The reigning cup holder FC Olimpiya Savyntsi was defeated by FC LNZ-Lebedyn in the competition final.

Participated clubs
In bold are clubs that are active at the same season AAFU championship (parallel round-robin competition).

 Cherkasy Oblast: LNZ-Lebedyn
 Dnipropetrovsk Oblast: FC Lozuvatka
 Ivano-Frankivsk Oblast: Karpaty Broshniv-Osada
 Kharkiv Oblast (2): Univer-Dynamo Kharkiv, FC Vovchansk
 Kherson Oblast: SC Kakhovka
 Kyiv Oblast (4): Dzhuniors Shpytky, Sokil Mykhailivka-Rubezhivka, Nyva Buzova, AFSC Kyiv
 Luhansk Oblast: Skif Shulhynka
 Lviv Oblast: Demnia-Feniks Demnia/Pidmonastyr

 Odessa Oblast: Sehedka-Tarutyne
 Poltava Oblast: Olimpiya Savyntsi
 Rivne Oblast: ODEK Orzhiv
 Sumy Oblast (5): Veleten Hlukhiv, Kolos Severynivka, FC Sumy, Naftovyk Okhtyrka, Viktoria Mykolaivka
 Volyn Oblast (3): LSTM No.536, Votrans Lutsk, Kovel-Volyn
 Zakarpattia Oblast: MFA Munkacs Mukacheve
 Zaporizhzhia Oblast: Metalurh-2 Zaporizhzhia
 Zhytomyr Oblast (3): Polissia Stavky, Zviahel Novohrad-Volynskyi, Mal Korosten

Notes
 Last season FC Sumy played as LS Group Verkhnia Syrovatka.
 Since 23 March 2021 Demnia-Feniks Demnia/Pidmonastyr is playing as Feniks Pidmonastyr.

Results

Preliminary round
First leg games were scheduled to be played on 16 September and second leg on 23 September.

|}
Notes:
 The game Naftovyk – Vovchansk was postponed to 23 and 30 September
 On 11 September Sehedka-Tarutyne announced that it will not arrive to its scheduled game

Round of 16
FC ODEK Orzhiv, FC Viktoriya Mykolaivka, FC LNZ-Lebedyn, FC Olimpiya Savyntsi (all the season's league participants) received a bye to the round. First leg games were scheduled to be played on 7 October and second leg on 14/21 October.

|}

Quarterfinals
First leg games were scheduled to be played on 28 October and second leg on 4 November. On 22 October 2020, the AAFU confirmed the pairs and postponed Nyva–Demnia-Feniks to spring of 2021. Since 23 March 2021 Demnia-Feniks Demnia/Pidmonastyr is playing as Feniks Pidmonastyr. Games between Nyva and Feniks were scheduled for April 7 and 14.

|}
Notes:

Semifinals
The dates of games arrangements were scheduled for 2021. On 8 April 2021 the AAFU determined dates for semifinals and finals. Semifinals will take place on April 21 and 28.

|}

Final
The dates of games arrangements were scheduled for 2021. Finals will take place on May 12 and 19.

|}

See also
 2020–21 Ukrainian Football Amateur League
 2020–21 Ukrainian Cup

Notes

References

External links
 Official website of the Association of Amateur Football of Ukraine (AAFU)
 There was determined the order to carrying out playoffs of Round of 16 of the Ukrainian Cup (Визначено порядок проведення 1/8 фіналу розіграшу Кубка України). AAFU. 1 October 2020.
 Artur Valerko. The AAFU Cup: goals of Mykhalyk and Fedetskyi, debut of Kabanov in his new hypostasis (Кубок ААФУ: голи Михалика та Федецького, дебют Кабанова в новій іпостасі). Sport Arena. 17 September 2020.
 Artur Valerko. The AAFU Cup: return of Naftovyk Okhtyrka, Fedetskyi, Mykhalyk, and Kabanov proceed forward (Кубок ААФУ: повернення охтирського Нафтовика, Федецький, Михалик і Кабанов ідуть далі). Sport Arena. 24 September 2020.
 Artur Valerko. The AAFU Cup: Naftovyk Okhtyrka ceased its struggle for the trophy (Кубок ААФУ: охтирський Нафтовик припинив боротьбу за трофей). Sport Arena. 30 September 2020
 Artur Valerko. The AAFU Cup: Viktoriya, LNZ and Olimpiya gained advantage in two goals (Кубок ААФУ: Вікторія, ЛНЗ і Олімпія здобувають перевагу в два голи). Sport Arena. 8 October 2020
 Artur Valerko. The AAFU Cup: Olimpiya continues to defend its trophy, the team of Mykhalyk and Fedetskyi finish their participation (Кубок ААФУ: Олімпія продовжує захист трофею, команда Михалика та Федецького завершує виступи). Sport Arena. 15 October 2020.
 Artur Valerko. The AAFU Cup: quarterfinals was reached by ODEK and Sumy (Кубок ААФУ: у чвертьфінал пробилися ОДЕК і Суми). Sport Arena. 22 October 2020
 Artur Valerko. The AAFU Cup: the intrigue in all match-up pairs is being kept (Кубок ААФУ: інтрига в усіх парах зберігається). Sport Arena. 29 October 2020
 Artur Valerko. The AAFU Cup: Viktoriya, LNZ and Olimpiya advance to semifinals (Кубок ААФУ: Вікторія, ЛНЗ та Олімпія виходять у півфінал). Sport Arena. 4 November 2020
 Artur Valerko. The AAFU Cup: Nyva and Feniks ended in draw in Buzova (Кубок ААФУ: Нива та Фенікс зіграли внічию в Бузовій). Sport Arena. 7 April 2021
 Artur Valerko. The AAFU Cup: Feniks is the fourth semifinalist. Buzova finished its participation in the tournament (Кубок ААФУ: Фенікс – четвертий півфіналіст. Бузова завершила виступ у турнірі). Sport Arena. 14 April 2021
 Artur Valerko. The AAFU Cup: first semifinals ended in draw. LNZ, Viktoriya, Olimpiya and Feniks keep their chances (Кубок ААФУ: перші півфінали — нічийні. ЛНЗ, Вікторія, Олімпія та Фенікс зберігають свої шанси). Sport Arena. 21 April 2021
 Artur Valerko. The AAFU Cup: semifinals in Lebedyn and Mykolaivka (Кубок ААФУ: півфінали в Лебедині та Миколаївці). Sport Arena. 28 April 2021
 Artur Valerko. The AAFU Cup. The first final shocks with its result (Кубок ААФУ. Перший фінал шокує результатом). Sport Arena. 12 May 2021
 Artur Valerko. The AAFU Cup. LNZ is a 2 time trophy winner. Olimpiya lost the cup without goals (Кубок ААФУ. ЛНЗ – дворазовий володар трофею. Олімпія програла кубок без голів). Sport Arena. 20 May 2021

Ukrainian Amateur Cup
Ukrainian Amateur Cup
Amateur Cup
Ukrainian Amateur Cup